The Motorola Milestone XT720 (known simply as "Motorola XT720") is an Android-based smartphone manufactured by Motorola Mobility, originally released in July 2010. Announced in June of that year, it was the first Motorola Android phone with xenon flash.

Features 

Features of the phone include a TI OMAP 3440 ARM Cortex A8 720 MHz CPU, 256 MB RAM, Wi-Fi 802.11b/g networking, Bluetooth 2.1 + EDR, micro-HDMI 1.4 (type D) port, with 720p video output, micro-USB 2.0.

It also features an 8 megapixel digital camera with xenon flash, a standard 3.5 mm headphone jack, interchangeable battery, 3.7 inch 854×480 px multi-touch capacitive touchscreen display. It also includes microSDHC support with bundled 8 GB card. It features the Gorilla Glass resistant coating.

It includes an ambient light sensor, a proximity sensor, a microphone, a magnetometer (Compass), a 3-axis accelerometer, and an aGPS.

The phone's "slide-to-unlock" feature was part of Apple Inc.'s German copyright infringement lawsuits against Motorola Mobility, which Apple won in two separate judgments in 2012.

Media 

If supports the following media formats:
 Audio: AMR-NB/WB, MP3, PCM, WAV, AAC, WMA eAAC, eAAC+, OGG
 Video: MPEG-4, H263, H264, WMV

Carriers 
The following carriers sold the Motorola Milestone XT720:

 Cincinnati Bell
 Vidéotron
 Wind Mobile
 Ntelos
 Cellular One

Software upgrades 
Motorola is unwilling to upgrade the Android 2.1 operating system preloaded on the Milestone XT720.  Nevertheless, wireless operator Cincinnati Bell as well as third-party developers have provided means to install the Android 2.2 operating system on the XT720.  Such upgrades are not certified by Motorola and involve the rooting of the smartphone.

Cincinnati Bell 
Cincinnati Bell certified a 2.2 software upgrade that can be installed by anyone who owns this phone or by the service provider's store representatives for their customers.  It has slight differences compared to an earlier update provided by Hellmonger

Third-party upgrades 
Hellmonger, a xda-developers user, released an Android 2.2 upgrade six months prior to Cincinnati Bell's upgrade.
RouthMape

Gallery

References

External links 

 
 Website at GSMArena
 Motorola XT720 upgrade Android 2.3.7 CyanogenMod 7.1.0 (French)

Milestone XT720
Android (operating system) devices
Discontinued smartphones